The 2000–01 season was Kilmarnock's third consecutive season in the Scottish Premier League. Kilmarnock also competed in the Scottish Cup and the Scottish League Cup.

Summary

Season
Kilmarnock finished fourth in the Scottish Premier League with 54 points. They reached the final of the League Cup but were beaten by Celtic. They also reached the quarter–final of the Scottish Cup, losing to Hibernian.

Results and fixtures

Kilmarnock's score comes first

Scottish Premier League

Scottish League Cup

Scottish Cup

Player statistics

|}

Final league table

Division summary

Transfers

Players in

Players out

References

External links
 Kilmarnock 2000–01 at Soccerbase.com (select relevant season from dropdown list)

Kilmarnock F.C. seasons
Kilmarnock